The Higher Regional Court of Cologne is one of the three Higher Regional Courts of North Rhine-Westphalia.

History 
The Higher Regional Court of Cologne is the successor of the Appellate court of Cologne which was formed by Frederick William III of Prussia on 21 June 1819. The Higher Regional Court formed on 27 January 1877, as did every Higher Regional Court due to the Gerichtsverfassungsgesetz (Courts Constitution Act).

Former presidents of the court 
 1879–1886: Heinrich Heimsoeth
 1887: Friedrich Wilhelm Vierhaus
 1987–1899: Johannes Struckmann
 1899–1905: Oskar Hamm
 1905–1908: Adolf Ratjen
 1909–1913: Karl Morkamer
 1914–1916: Albrecht Nückel
 1916–1922: Josef Frenken
 1923–1932: Heinrich Reichartz
 1932–1933: Max-Josef Volmer
 1933–1943: Alexander Bergmann
 1943–1944: Erich Lawall
 1948–1962: Werner Korintenberg
 1962–1975: Josef Wolffram
 1978–1983: Herbert Weltrich
 1984–1996: Dieter Laum
 1997–2003: Armin Lünterbusch
 2004: vacant
 2005–2014: Johannes Riedel
 2014–2016: Peter Kamp
 2017–2019: Margarete Gräfin von Schwerin
 2020–2021: vacant
 since 2021: Bernd Scheiff

References 

Courts and tribunals established in 1877
Courts in Germany
Organisations based in Cologne